Haji Agha, the Cinema Actor (in Persian: حاجی آقا آکتور سینما; transliterated as Haji Agha Aktor-e Cinema) is a 1933  Iranian comedy  film directed by Iranian-Armenian director, Ovannes Oganian and one of a few remaining Iranian silent films. This was Ohaninan's second film in Iran after the success of Abi and Rabi, his first silent film. The film reflects the clash between tradition and modernity in Iranian society in the early 1930s. While Abi and Rabi did well commercially, Haji Agha Aktor-e Cinema did not succeed at the box office due to its technical shortcomings and the fact that its release coincided with the first Persian talkie, Dokhtar-e Lor.

The film tells the story of a director (played by Ohanian) is searching for a subject for his film, when he receives a suggestion to film Haji Agha, a wealthy conservative man. Haji’s daughter, son-in-law, and servant help the director orchestrate a series of events that enable the director to film Haji in action. When the film is finished and Haji views it, he sees his own image on the screen and, enthralled by it, begins to appreciate the merits of cinema.

Plot
A director (Ovanes Ohanian) looks for a subject for his movie and someone suggests that he secretly film Haji Agha. Haji is very rich and frowns upon cinema. Haji's daughter, son-in-law, and servant help the director with the film. Haji's watch gets lost, and he suspects his servant. Haji and his son-in-law start chasing him. At first, they tail him to the dentist's, and then they meet a fakir who claims he can find the lost watch. He does some strange things. The director photographs Haji all the time. Then Haji watches the film and becomes aware of the true merits of cinema.

Cast 
Abbas-Gholi Edalatpour	as Puri	
Asia Ghostantin as Parvin		
Habibollah Morad as Haji Agha		
Ovanes Ohanian	as The director	
Zema Ohanian as Pari		
Gholam-Hossein Sohrabi-Fard as Monsieur Abi	
Abbas-Kahn Tahbaz as Parviz

Production
Shooting started in June 1932 and the camera used was a "Pathe" camera which was more than 20 years old.

References

External links
Haji Agha, the Cinema Actor in IMDb

1933 films
1930s Persian-language films
Iranian silent films
Silent comedy films
1933 comedy films
Articles containing video clips
Iranian black-and-white films
Iranian comedy films